Wild Ducks Flying Backward is a book by Tom Robbins, published on August 30, 2005.  It is a collection of poems, short stories, essays, reviews, and other brief writings from Robbins' career. The stories were collected from Tom's work in magazines such as Esquire, Playboy, The New York Times, and elsewhere.

References 

2005 books
Books by Tom Robbins
Bantam Books books
American anthologies